You're My Best Friend is the fourth LP by American country singer-songwriter Don Williams. Released in April 1975 on the ABC-Dot label, the album reached number five on the US Country Albums chart. "You're My Best Friend" and "(Turn Out the Light And) Love Me Tonight" were released as singles in 1975, both reaching number one on the Billboard country singles chart.

Background 
The previous year, Don Williams achieved his first number-one single with the song "I Wouldn't Want to Live If You Didn't Love Me". He teamed up again with regular collaborators, including Bob McDill, Allen Reynolds, Dickey Lee and Wayland Holyfield to craft another chart success.

Track listing 
from the original vinyl

Side A

 "You're My Best Friend" (Wayland Holyfield) – 2:43
 "Help Yourselves to Each Other" (Bob McDill) – 2:29
 "I Don't Wanna Let Go" (Holyfield) – 3:12
 "Sweet Fever" (Dickey Lee, McDill) – 2:17
 "Someone Like You" (Lee, McDill) – 3:02

Side B

 "(Turn Out the Light And) Love Me Tonight" (McDill) – 2:18
 "Where Are You" (Don Williams) – 2:51
 "Tempted" (Al Turney) – 3:27
 "You're the Only One" (Williams) – 2:44
 "Reason to Be" (Kerry Livgren, Williams) – 3:02

Personnel
Joe Allen - bass guitar
Jim Colvard - acoustic guitar, electric guitar
Lloyd Green - steel guitar, dobro
Shane Keister - keyboards
Kenny Malone - drums, conga, marimba
Danny Flowers - harmonica
Don Williams - acoustic guitar
Jerry Stembridge - acoustic guitar, electric guitar

Charts

Weekly charts

Year-end charts

References 

1975 albums
Don Williams albums
Albums produced by Allen Reynolds